Ludwig Gärtner (19 April 1919 – 6 June 1995) was a German international footballer.

References

1919 births
1995 deaths
Association football forwards
German footballers
Germany international footballers